Sir Percy Rolfe Sargood (1865–1940) was a New Zealand businessman and philanthropist. He was born in Melbourne, Victoria, Australia, in 1865.

In the 1935 New Year Honours, Sargood was appointed a Knight Bachelor, for public services. He was posthumously inducted into the New Zealand Business Hall of Fame in 2011.

References

1865 births
1940 deaths
New Zealand philanthropists
New Zealand businesspeople
Australian emigrants to New Zealand
New Zealand Knights Bachelor
Businesspeople awarded knighthoods